is a role-playing video game released in Japan on March 28, 1989 by Jaleco for the Family Computer. It is part of Jaleco's Ninja JaJaMaru-kun series and was originally scheduled for a North American release under the name Taro's Quest, although it was never released. Ninja Taro, another game in the series, was localized for America instead.

References

1989 video games
Adventure games
Jaleco games
Japan-exclusive video games
Ninja Jajamaru
Nintendo Entertainment System games
Nintendo Entertainment System-only games
Video games developed in Japan